
Gmina Ostrów Mazowiecka is a rural gmina (administrative district) in Ostrów Mazowiecka County, Masovian Voivodeship, in east-central Poland. Its seat is the town of Ostrów Mazowiecka, although the town is not part of the territory of the gmina.

Villages
Gmina Ostrów Mazowiecka contains the villages and settlements of Antoniewo, Biel, Budy-Grudzie, Dybki, Fidury, Guty-Bujno, Jasienica, Jelenie, Jelonki, Kalinowo, Kalinowo-Parcele, Komorowo, Nagoszewka Druga, Nagoszewka Pierwsza, Nagoszewo, Nieskórz, Nowa Grabownica, Nowa Osuchowa, Nowe Lubiejewo, Pałapus Szlachecki, Pałapus Włościański, Podborze, Pólki, Popielarnia, Prosienica, Przyjmy, Rogóźnia, Sielc, Smolechy, Stara Grabownica, Stara Osuchowa, Stare Lubiejewo, Stok, Sulęcin-Kolonia, Ugniewo, Wiśniewo, Zakrzewek and Zalesie.

Neighbouring gminas
Gmina Ostrów Mazowiecka is bordered by the town of Ostrów Mazowiecka and by the gminas of Andrzejewo, Brańszczyk, Brok, Czerwin, Długosiodło, Małkinia Górna, Stary Lubotyń, Szumowo, Wąsewo and Zaręby Kościelne.

References

Polish official population figures 2006

Ostrow Mazowiecka
Ostrów Mazowiecka County